Evgeni Valev Yanchovski  (born 5 September 1939) is a Bulgarian former football player and manager.

Yanchovski represented Bulgaria at the 1966 FIFA World Cup. He also played for Bulgaria at the 1968 Summer Olympics.

At club level he played for Levski Karlovo and subsequently Beroe Stara Zagora from 1960 to 1974, where he appeared in 341 matches and scored 31 goals.

As a manager, he led Beroe to the championship title in the Bulgarian A PFG in 1986.

Honours

Player 
Beroe
 Balkans Cup (2): 1967–68; 1969

Manager 
Beroe
 Bulgarian League: 1985–86

References

1939 births
Living people
Bulgarian footballers
Bulgaria international footballers
1966 FIFA World Cup players
Footballers at the 1968 Summer Olympics
Olympic footballers of Bulgaria
Olympic silver medalists for Bulgaria
FC Levski Karlovo players
PFC Beroe Stara Zagora players
Olympic medalists in football
First Professional Football League (Bulgaria) players
Bulgarian football managers
PFC Beroe Stara Zagora managers
PFC Spartak Varna managers
People from Byala Slatina
Medalists at the 1968 Summer Olympics
Association football midfielders